Ján Lipiansky (born July 23, 1974) is a former Slovak professional ice hockey player who played in the Czech Extraliga, Slovak Extraliga, Finnish Liiga, and Kontinental Hockey League.

Career statistics

References

External links
 

1974 births
Ässät players
HC Ambrì-Piotta players
HC Karlovy Vary players
HC Košice players
HC Slovan Bratislava players
VHK Vsetín players
Hershey Bears players
Kassel Huskies players
Living people
Ice hockey people from Bratislava
Philadelphia Flyers draft picks
Slovak ice hockey left wingers
Tappara players
Slovak expatriate ice hockey players in the United States
Slovak expatriate ice hockey players in the Czech Republic
Slovak expatriate ice hockey players in Finland
Slovak expatriate ice hockey players in Sweden
Slovak expatriate ice hockey players in Germany
Slovak expatriate ice hockey players in Switzerland